Pedro Sánchez (born 1972) is the incumbent Prime Minister of Spain.

Pedro Sánchez may also refer to:

People
Pedro Sánchez de Castro (fl. 1454–1484), Spanish painter
Pedro Sánchez Ciruelo (c. 1465–1548), Spanish mathematician
Pedro Sánchez Falconete (fl. 1644), Spanish architect
Pedro Sánchez Gamarra (fl. 2008), Peruvian politician
Pedro Sánchez de la Hoz (1514–1547), Spanish  merchant, conquistador and adelantado 
 (died 1276), Spanish aristocrat
 (fl. 1996–1999), Spanish journalist and former presenter for Spanish newscast Telediario
Pedro Sánchez Rendón (c.1590–1658), Spanish aristocrat
Pedro Sánchez de Tagle, 2nd Marquis of Altamira (1661–1723), Spanish aristocrat
Pedro A. Sanchez (born 1940), Cuban-American soil scientist and World Food Prize Laureate
Pedro Julio Sánchez (born 1940), Colombian cyclist
Pedro León Sánchez Gil (born 1986), Spanish footballer
 (born 1954), Spanish actor; see The First Adventure
Pedro C. Sanchez (1925–1987), a Guamanian politician
Pedro Sanchez (actor) or Ignazio Spalla (1924–1995), Italian actor
Pedro Sánchez (footballer, born 1986), Spanish football winger
Pedro Sánchez (equestrian) (born 1966), Spanish Olympic equestrian
Pedro Sánchez (footballer, born 1998), Chilean football midfielder

Other
Pedro Sanchez (Napoleon Dynamite), a character in Napoleon Dynamite
Pedro Sánchez (district), municipal district of El Seibo, Dominican Republic